Piccoli is an Italian surname. Notable people with the surname include:

Adrian Piccoli (born 1970), Australian politician
Anselmo Piccoli (1915–1992), Argentine artist
Bernardino Piccoli (1581–1636), Roman Catholic prelate
Enrica Piccoli (born 1999), Italian synchronised swimmer
Fantasio Piccoli (1917–1981), Italian stage director
Flaminio Piccoli (1918–2000), Italian politician
Francesco De Piccoli (born 1937), Italian boxer
Gianluca Piccoli (born 1997), Italian footballer
Ivan Piccoli (born 1981), Italian footballer
James Piccoli (born 1991), Canadian cyclist
Mariano Piccoli (born 1970), Italian cyclist
Michel Piccoli (1925–2020), French actor
Nestor Omar Piccoli (born 1965), Argentine footballer
Nino Piccoli, Italian racing driver

Italian-language surnames